X Factor is a Romanian television music competition that aims to find a new music talent to become a star. The first season began airing on September 17, 2011, on Antena 1 and ended on January 1, 2012. The winner received a price of €200,000. 
Based on the UK format, the competition consists of auditions in front of specialized judges that afterwards become mentors. Auditions for the show began in May, 2011 and concluded in June, 2011. The show is hosted by TV presenters Răzvan Simion and Dani Oțil, while the judging panel consists of recording artist and producer Adrian Sînă of the group Akcent, singer-songwriter Paula Seling and Radio DJ Mihai Morar.

Selection process

Auditions

Auditions for producers began in Cluj-Napoca, România, on May 14, 2011. They then took place in Constanța, on May 21 in Timișoara on May 24, 2011, on June 4 in Iași and concluded on June 11, 2011 in Bucharest.

Bootcamp

After the bootcamp period, there were twenty-four acts left.
16-24s: Sanziana Nicolae, Andrei Leonte, Cristina Dobrescu, Bogdan Medvedi, Bianca Purcarea, Tania Kramar, Irina Florea, Nae Ovidiu Nicolae

Judges houses

During Judges houses period, they were sectioned into three different categories.
Paula Seling, helped by Alexander Rybak, Adrian Sînă, helped by Alexandra Ungureanu and Mihai Morar, helped by Laurențiu Duță

Contestants

The 12 contestants were confirmed as follows;

Key:
 – Winner
 – Runner up
 – Third Place

Live shows

Results summary
Color key

Live show details

Week 1 (October 29/30)
Theme(s): Number-one singles
Group Performance: Oficial îmi merge bine
Musical guest: Oceana — "Cry,Cry"

Week 2 (November 5/6)
Theme(s): Romanian songs
Group Performance: Billionaire
Musical guest: Voltaj — "20" & "Dă vina pe Voltaj"

Week 3 (November 12/13)
Theme(s): Songs from movies
Group Performance: You're the One That I Want
Musical guest: Touch & Go — "Would You...?"

Week 4 (November 19/20)
Theme(s): Love songs
Group Performance: Don't Stop Believin'
Musical guest: Holograf — "Să nu-mi iei niciodată dragostea"

Week 5 (November 26/27)
Theme(s): Mentors' favorite songs
Group performance: Beat It
Musical guest: East 17 — "Thunder"

Week 6 (December 3/4)
Theme: Live Band
Group Performance: (I Can't Get No) Satisfaction
Musical guest: Direcția 5 — "Îți mulțumesc" & "Ai un loc"

Week 7 (December 10/11)
Theme: Audience' choice and Mentors' choice
Group performance: I Gotta Feeling
Musical guest: Alexander Rybak — "Europe Skies" and "Fairytale"

As a worldwide X Factor premiere, Diana Hetea wasn't able to perform a "Save Me Song" because she suffered of Laryngitis that night. So as a convention, the producers decided to put on a footage with all of her performances during the X Factor galas.

Week 8: (December 17/18)
Theme(s): Musical Heroes / Mentor's Choice
Group Performance: Another Brick in the Wall
Musical guest: In-Grid -  "Tu es foutu" & "Vive Le Swing"

Week 9: (December 24/25)
Theme(s): Christmas Songs, Mentors' choice
Group Performance: 
 24 December : Contestants from auditions — "Deschide ușa, creștine"
 25 December : X Factor Finalists  — "La casa di peste drum"
Musical guest: Paula Seling — "Colindăm (Iarna)", "Timpul" & "Noapte caldă"

Week 10: (January 1)
Theme(s): Audition Songs, Celebrity Duets, Winner's Single
Group Performance: We Will Rock You
Musical guests: Vama ("Copilul care aleargă către mare"), Mandinga ("Danza Kuduro", "Zaleilah"), ROA ("Ne place", "Sonată în la minor"), Vunk ("Artificii pe tavan"), Laurențiu Duță feat. X Factor Finalists ("Amintirile")

Ratings

References

External links
X Factor Romania Official website

Romania 01
Romanian music
X Factor (Romanian TV series)
2011 Romanian television series debuts
Antena 1 (Romania) original programming
2010s Romanian television series
2011 Romanian television seasons
2012 Romanian television seasons